Bonit or Bonitus may refer to:
Bonitus (abbot) (died  584), abbot of Monte Cassino
Bonitus (bishop) (623–710), 7th century Frankish bishop
Bonitus (magister militum), 4th century Frankish general